Bashilov is a Russian masculine surname, its feminine counterpart is Bashilova. Notable people with the surname include:

Alexander Bashilov (1777–1847), Russian military officer
Mikhail Bashilov (born 1993), Russian football player

Russian-language surnames